Samuel Barnardiston may refer to:

Sir Samuel Barnardiston, 1st Baronet (1620–1707), English Whig MP for Suffolk, Deputy Governor of East India Company
Sir Samuel Barnardiston, 2nd Baronet (1659–1709), MP for Ipswich
Sir Samuel Barnardiston, 5th Baronet (1681–1736) of the Barnardiston baronets